Samrat Ashoka  is a 1992 Indian Telugu-language historical drama film produced and directed by N. T. Rama Rao under his Ramakrishna Horticultural Cine Studios banner. It stars Rama Rao and Vani Viswanath, with music composed by M. S. Viswanathan.

Plot
The film is based on the life of the 3rd Mauryan Indian emperor Ashoka.

Cast
N. T. Rama Rao as Ashoka & Chanakya (Dual role)  
Vani Viswanath as Tishya Raksha
Mohan Babu as Malavasimha
Gummadi as Bouddha Parivrajaka
Satyanarayana as Rayani Rachamallu
Ranganath as Bindusara 
Ramakrishna as  Jayamallu 
Kanta Rao
 Dhulipala as Ujjayini Mahamantri 
Ratan Babu as Preggada 
Malladi
Bhanumathi Ramakrishna as Kartruni 
B. Saroja Devi as Karmani
Lakshmi

Soundtrack

Music composed by  M. S. Viswanathan. Lyrics were written by C. Narayana Reddy. Music released by LEO Audio Company.

References

Indian biographical drama films
Indian historical drama films
Indian epic films
Works about the Maurya Empire
Films scored by M. S. Viswanathan
Films directed by N. T. Rama Rao
1990s biographical drama films
1990s historical drama films
1990s Telugu-language films
Memorials to Ashoka
Cultural depictions of Ashoka